CSPA can stand for:

 Canadian Sport Parachuting Association, governs parachuting sports
 Child Soldiers Prevention Act, a US law enacted to address the problem of children losing their eligibility for immigration benefits because they had aged-out as a result of processing delays
 Chinese Student Protection Act of 1992, a bill sponsored by US Representative Nancy Pelosi (D-CA) which granted permanent residency to all Chinese nationals who arrived in the United States on or before April 11, 1990.
 Columbia Scholastic Press Association, a program of the Graduate School of Journalism at Columbia University in the City of New York
 Consumer Specialty Products Association, an industry trade association
 CspA mRNA 5′ UTR, part of the messenger RNA of the major cold shock protein CspA